Move Loot was a company and online marketplace for the buying and selling of secondhand (used) furniture. Move Loot was headquartered in San Francisco, CA. Move Loot served the following markets: San Francisco Bay Area, New York, New York, Los Angeles, California, Raleigh, North Carolina, Durham, North Carolina, Charlotte, North Carolina and Atlanta, Georgia.

Overview
Users submitted photos of their goods online for appraisal, and the company then managed aspects of the selling, shipping and installation process. The company assessed furniture prior to posting it, and had minimum standards for style and quality. Move Loot earned 50% of the selling price when items were sold. Part of the company's business paradigm was for less furniture to be sent to landfills and to increase the length of time furniture was used.

History

Move Loot was founded by Bill Bobbitt (CEO), Jenny Morrill (CMO), Ryan Smith (CTO), and Shruti Shah (COO). It launched in 2013. By October 2015, the service had 12 partnering retailers, 150 movers, and 100,000 users.

Move Loot was backed by First Round Capital, Index Ventures, Google Ventures, Metamorphic Ventures, and others. As of November 2015, Move Loot had received $21.8 M in funding. It ceased operations in July 2016.

References

External links
Robin Son Affiliate

Online marketplaces of the United States
Furniture retailers of the United States
Privately held companies based in California